Makhdoom Syed Mustafa Mehmood (born 29 June 1986) is a Pakistani politician who has been a member of the National Assembly of Pakistan, since August 2018. Previously he was a member of the National Assembly from February 2012 to May 2018.

Early life
He was born on 29 June 1986.

Political career
He was elected to the National Assembly of Pakistan as a candidate of Pakistan Muslim League (F) (PML-F) from Constituency NA-195 (Rahim Yar Khan-IV) in by-election held in February 2012. He received 81,745 votes and defeated an independent candidate, Tariq Chohan.

He was re-elected to the National Assembly as a candidate of Pakistan Peoples Party (PPP) from Constituency NA-195 (Rahim Yar Khan-IV) in 2013 Pakistani general election. He received 97,778 votes and defeated Khusro Bakhtiar.

He was re-elected to the National Assembly as a candidate of PPP from Constituency NA-178 (Rahim Yar Khan-IV) in 2018 Pakistani general election.

References

Living people
Pakistan People's Party politicians
Punjabi people
1986 births
Pakistani MNAs 2013–2018
Pakistani MNAs 2008–2013
Pakistani MNAs 2018–2023